Kfarhouna,, also known as Kfar Houneh or Kfar Houné, is a town in the Jezzine District of the South Governorate, of Lebanon. Its incumbent mayor is Sami Issa.

Geography and Location 
Located 80 kilometres away from the capital Beirut in the predominantly Christian district of Jezzine, the population of Kfarhouna mainly consists of Melkite Greek Catholics and Shiite Muslims. The town's altitude ranges between 1100 and 1400 metres above sea level

History
In 1838, Eli Smith noted  Kefr Huneh  as a village by Jezzin, "East of et-Tuffa".

Etymology 
The name of this town comes from the Aramaic  'Kfar Ahoneh', which means "young brothers' village" according to local legend.

References

Bibliography

 

Populated places in Jezzine District
Melkite Christian communities in Lebanon
Shia Muslim communities in Lebanon